Tsofen High Technology Centers Ltd is an Israeli-registered public benefit company based in Nazareth, northern Israel, established as a joint Arab and Jewish nonprofit organization promoting hi-tech in Israeli Arab society, as a lever for economic development and the creation of a shared society in Israel, based on equal participation in a sustainable economy. Tsofen's mission is to integrate Arabs into Israel’s hi-tech sector and bring hi-tech centers to Arab cities.

History and leadership
Tsofen was formed in Nazareth in 2008 by Smadar Nehab, a hi-tech entrepreneur, Sami Saadi, an independent CPA, and Yossi Coten, a former Amdocs executive. Saadi remained one of two Co-CEOs until stepping down at the end of February 2022. Currently operating from offices in Nazareth and Kafr Qasim, the current Co-CEOs are Maisam Jaljuli, who replaced Saadi in July 2022, and Revital Duek, who replaced Paz Hirschmann in 2019. Tsofen's board, which is half Jewish and half Arab, and whose members include professionals with backgrounds in hi-tech, academia, and business, is chaired by Dr Ramzi Halabi, a former mayor of Daliyat al-Carmel and currently a lecturer at Tel Aviv University. Tsofen established the Public Council for Promoting Hi-Tech in the Arab Society in Israel, to support and facilitate its mission; it is co-chaired by Professor Ziyad Hanna, VP of R&D at Cadence and visiting professor at Oxford University, and David (Dadi) Perlmutter, former executive vice president, Intel Corporation.

When Tsofen was established, Arab engineers accounted for 0.5% of employees in Israeli hi-tech (about 350 people). Today, they represent 3.7% (about 5,500 people), and Tsofen's stated goal is to increase that percentage to at least 10% by 2025. At a time when there is a shortage of over 15,000 hi-tech engineers in Israel, the Arab community is a key demographic group with the potential to help meet the shortage, with thousands of suitably qualified Arabs who, for various reasons, either do not seek employment in hi-tech or cannot find a way in. In addition, increasing numbers of Arabs are studying hi-tech related subjects at tertiary level: whereas there were only 1,600 Arab graduates in high-tech academic studies between 1985 and 2014, over 2,200 Arab students enrolled in high-tech academic studies in 2016 alone.

Tsofen is a member of Co-Impact (formerly Collective Impact), the partnership for a Breakthrough in Arab Employment, which is a partner in ex-President Reuven Rivlin’s Israeli Hope initiative focusing on four aspects of Israeli society: Academia, Education, Sports and Employment.

Tsofen's theory of change
By supporting the integration of Arab engineers in Israel’s hi-tech industry—especially at a time when it is in great need of qualified personnel—Tsofen aims to influence a deep institutional effect on the industry’s make-up and culture, towards a wider impact: (a) As the Arab community contributes a greater share to Israel’s economic growth it will also enjoy its benefits more equally, improving the socio-economic status of the Arab community and reducing disparities, and (b) Arabs and Jews live will develop a shared society, beginning in the technological work-space, where daily work interactions and relationships are developed that change prejudice, stereotypes and biases.

Tsofen's model
 Nurturing human talent in Arab society by exposing high school students to hi-tech, providing applied technological training to academic students and graduates, and building networks for Arab hi-tech professionals, in cooperation with leading hi-tech firms.  
 Changing the hi-tech industry landscape by placing thousands of Arab engineers in jobs, by working with hi-tech firms to make recruitment and hiring policies more inclusive, and by bringing hi-tech businesses to Arab cities.  
 Changing national policies and priorities by ‘mainstreaming’ its programs within the government, academia, and business sectors.

Key Tsofen accomplishments and impact 2008–2020
 Exposing more than 13,000 Arab high school students to the hi-tech industry and opening to them the option of a hi-tech career. 
 1,100 Arab undergraduate students and recent graduates completed 53 applied technological courses.
 Some 3,000 Arab engineers were placed in hi-tech jobs.
 1,200 Arab engineers working in 80 hi-tech firms that opened in Nazareth since 2008, including: Microsoft, Amdocs, Broadcom, Alpha Omega, Galil Software, SalesForce.
 In 2018, the Israeli government resolved to allocate 25 million New Israel Shekels to developing hi-tech parks in two Arab cities.
 Tsofen's 5-year Plan for hi-tech and innovation in Arab society, developed with the National Arab Local Councils Committee in Israel, was incorporated fully into government resolution 550, fully budgeted and confirmed by the Knesset in November 2021.

Awards
 2012: Sami Saadi (Founding CEO) named in The Marker 100 Most Influential List
 2015: Speaker of the Knesset (Israel's parliament) Quality of Life prize for promoting mutual understanding between Jews and Arabs
 2017: Sami Saadi (Founding CEO) named in Calcalist 100 Most Influential List
 2018: Abraham Fund Initiatives Shared Society Award
 2018: Walaa Ibrahim, Tsofen's Head of Human Capital Development, was named by The Marker as one of 21 Women Changing the Face of Israeli Hi-Tech
 2019: Prof Ziyad Hanna (Co-Chair of Tosfen’s Public Council) named in The Marker 100 Most Influential List
 2021: Tsofen chosen as semi-finalist #15 in the iValues: Rethink Politics in the MENA Region Awards for its 5-Year Policy Plan for Advancement of Hi-Tech in Israel's Arab Society.
 2021: Sami Saadi (Founding & Retiring CEO) and David (Dadi) Perlmutter (Co-Chair of Tsofen’s Public Council) awarded Honorary Fellowships from Afeka Tel Aviv Academic College of Engineering.

References

External links
 
 Excerpt from Holy Land – Start-Up Nations: Tsofen’s Co-CEOs’ Insights
 ‘Cracking the Code’ on Strategy, Times of Israel, 4 March 2019
 Tsofen on Guidestar Israel

Arab citizens of Israel
Non-profit organizations based in Israel